The Tunisian Ligue Professionnelle 1, previously called the Tunisian National Championship between 1956 and 1994, is the top division football tournament in Tunisia under the organization of the Tunisian Football Federation. The first edition was held during the French protectorate of Tunisia, the 1907 season, under the auspices of the Federation of Union des Sociétés Françaises de Sports Athlétiques, and it was played in a knockout system, and the first official match in the history of the tournament was played on 9 June 1907.

At that time, Tunisian teams with a French character and management participated in it, including Racing Club de Tunis, Sporting Club de Tunis, Club Italia de Tunis, Savoy La Goulette, Union sportive tunisienne, Stade gaulois and many other teams. In 1921, the Tunisian Football Association League was established, which is the Tunisian branch of the French Football Federation, which was relied upon until the declaration of independence in 1956.

On 29 March 1957, the Tunisian Football Federation, the official federation organizing football tournaments in Tunisia, was established. The Tunisian championship has been professional since 1994 after the founding of the Ligue Nationale du Football Professionnel, becoming the first professional championship in Africa and the Arab world. Espérance de Tunis is the most crowned Tunisian with 31 titles, the last of which was the 2020–21 season.

The first and second places in the standings automatically qualify for the CAF Champions League, and the third place automatically qualifies for the CAF Confederation Cup, along with the Tunisian Cup winner, while the Tunisian Football Federation chooses those who qualifies for the Arab Club Champions Cup. The Tunisian Ligue Professionnelle 1 occupies the first place in the Arab and African countries and 15th in the world, according to the ranking of the International Federation of Football History & Statistics for the year 2019.

History

Union des Sociétés Françaises de Sports Athlétiques 

Football was born in Tunisia in 1904 with the unofficial creation of the Racing Club de Tunis, formalized in 1905 but which had to wait for the creation of other clubs in Tunis and Bizerte to participate in an official competition. Then the government is obliged, in front of the considerable development of outdoor sport, to take an active interest in it. It distributed a few grants, though very small. A committee of the Union des Sociétés Françaises de Sports Athlétiques, responsible for the management of all sports in Tunisia, was then created.

In 1910, a first series championship was organized with the participation of the Racing Club, Sporting Club de Tunis, Lycée Carnot de Tunis, the Colonial School of Agriculture, the Football Club of Tunis and the Red Star Club de l'Ariana, and a second series made up of the second teams of Racing Club de Tunis, Sporting and Gallia Club. The national title is awarded after a final between Racing and Stade maritime de Bizerte (champion of the Mediterranean squadrons) with a score of 2–0.

But many teams, often ephemeral, play friendly matches, like Radès Club, Amical Club, Tunis Sport, Ariana Club, Stade tunisien, Etoile Sportive de Tunis, Sadiki College, etc. There are then very few Tunisian players including Hamadi Ben Dhif (Racing Club goalkeeper), while the second team Lycée Carnot includes players with Tunisian names: Bouzid, Abdelwahab, Zaouchi, Djilani Romdhan, Fredj, H. Zaouch, Ahmed Sakka and Mustapha Romdhan.

But, surprisingly, La Dépêche tunisienne published on 12 June 1910 the list of players of the Khereddine Club team, called to play against the Ariana Club and who are all Tunisians: Abderrahman (captain), Babbou, Aichi, Jaouez, Ben Smaïl, Djaziri, Hammouda, Mohamed, Bechak, Tebourbi and Aguiri. It is the first fully Tunisian team but which we have not heard from later and which precedes the Comète Club team, created in 1914 but which did not survive the First World War. The Racing Club won the championship in 1910, 1911 and 1914, then in 1920 and 1921, while Sporting de Ferryville was crowned in 1912 and 1913.

Ligue de Tunisie de Football Association 

The championship became official with the creation of the Tunisian Football Association League in 1921 was established, which is the Tunisian branch of the French Football Federation. Until 1939, the title of champion was awarded following play-offs between regional champions. The major current clubs were created during this period: Espérance de Tunis (1919), Club Africain and Sfax Railways Sports (1920), Étoile Sportive du Sahel (1925), Club Athletic Bizertin and Club Sportif Sfaxien (1928).

From 1946 to 1947, a championship of "excellence" (national division) is created and is contested at the national level. In 1944–1945, 1945–1946 and 1952–1953, the championship was not contested and replaced by a criterium (a sort of group tournament where participation was not compulsory). These years saw the creation of the Stade Tunisien (1948).

Media coverage 

On 31 July 2015, the Tunisian Football Federation announced the sale of the TV rights of the championship to the company B4 Production for three seasons, starting from the 2015–16 season. The latter obtains the exclusivity of these rights concerning the Gulf and Maghreb countries, while maintaining the rights of the Al-Kass Sports Channel for the 2015–16 season and without questioning the rights of the El Watania 1, El Watania 2 and Hannibal TV channels. to also broadcast the matches of the Championship and the Tunisian Cup. The federation does not indicate in its press release the amount of the transaction, specifying that the company B4 Production had presented the best financial offer.

The federation and national television seal on 6 October 2016 an agreement on television rights for three seasons. Under the agreement, worth 13 million dinars, or 4.5 million per season, national television will be able to broadcast live four matches of each day of the championship. This agreement concerns the 2016–17, 2017–18 and 2018–19 seasons and makes national television the exclusive broadcaster in Tunisian Ligue Professionnelle 1matches and the only television authorized to film all the matches of the week.

Broadcasting rights

Qualification for African competitions

Association ranking for 2020–21 CAF competitions
Association ranking for 2020–21 CAF Champions League and 2020–21 CAF Confederation Cup will be based on results from each CAF tournament (Champions League and Confederation Cup) from 2016 to 2019–20.

Legend
 CL: CAF Champions League
 CC: CAF Confederation Cup

Current season

2022–23 season participating Clubs

Champions

By club

 Teams in Bold compete in 2022–23 Ligue 1.
 Teams in Italique are Defunct.

Number of Titles by Region

 Teams in Italique are Defunct.

Performance comparison since 2010 

Performance comparison of top teams since 2010.

Records and statistics

Most titled players

Most titled Managers

Faouzi Benzarti has won the tournament on a record nine occasions with Espérance Sportive de Tunis, Étoile Sportive du Sahel and Club Africain Youssef Zouaoui have won the title on five occasions

League participation 

As of 2020, 53 clubs have participated. Note: The tallies since independence in 1956 until the end of the 2019–20 season.

 65 seasons: CS Sfaxien, Club Africain
 64 seasons: Espérance de Tunis, Stade Tunisien
 63 seasons: Étoile Sportive du Sahel, CA Bizertin
 57 seasons: CS Hammam Lif
 53 seasons: AS Marsa
 45 seasons: US Monastir
 34 seasons: JS Kairouan, Sfax railway sport
 29 seasons: Olympique Béja
 22 seasons: ES Zarzis
 15 seasons: Stade Gabèsien
 13 seasons: Océano Club de Kerkennah, Olympique du Kef
 12 seasons: EGS Gafsa, Stade Soussien
 10 seasons: US Tunis
 9 seasons: El Makarem de Mahdia, AS Gabès, CS Cheminots
 7 seasons: AS Kasserine, US Maghrébine, Stade Sportif Sfaxien
 5 seasons: ES Métlaoui, US Ben Guerdane, ES Hammam-Sousse
 4 seasons: JS Metouia, Stade populaire, CO Médenine, US Tataouine, El Ahly Mateur
 3 seasons: EO La Goulette et Kram, Jendouba Sport, Patrie Football Club bizertin, AS Djerba,
 2 seasons: EO Sidi Bouzid, AS Oued Ellil, AS Megrine, Grombalia Sports, CS Chebba, AS Soliman, Patriote de Sousse
 1 season: LPS Tozeur, CS Menzel Bouzelfa, STIA Sousse, AS Ariana, CS Korba, FC Jerissa

Top scorers

The day after Tunisia's independence in 1956, the newspaper Le Petit Matin took charge of establishing the classification of the top scorer in the Tunisian Ligue Professionnelle 1.

The newspaper Al Amal took over in 1961 then it was L'Action Tunisienne which formalized the classification and endowed it with a price from 1967, in parallel with the weekly Le Sport. Then, with the development of the media and the coverage of Tunisian Ligue Professionnelle 1 matches, this ranking becomes more known.

All-time top scorers

Top scorers by season
This is the list of top scorers by season.

All-time table (1956–2020)

General classification

The classification of the Tunisian Ligue Professionnelle 1 table all seasons combined is a classification which aims to determine which team in the history of the Tunisian football championship has had the most success, not by the number of titles but by the number of points.

This ranking combines all the points and goals of each team that has played in the Tunisian championship since independence in 1956 until the end of the 2019–20 season.

African and international competitions

Best finish in African and international competitions by club 
Tunisian teams are among the best African teams with a total of 24 titles. 12 Tunisian team in total played in African competitions. Étoile Sportive du Sahel is the Tunisian club that has won the most African Cups with 9 titles, followed by Espérance de Tunis with 8 titles.

Tunisian clubs also have a share in the FIFA Club World Cup with four participations, three for Espérance de Tunis in 2011, 2018 and 2019 thanks to the African Champions League title in 2011, 2018 and 2018–19 and the only participation of Etoile du Sahel in 2007, which was then ranked fourth as the best result for Tunisian teams in the FIFA Club World Cup.

In the CAF Champions League, Tunisian clubs occupy a huge position in the competition. Espérance de Tunis has the most Tunisian clubs participating in the competition with 25 times. It reached the final 8 times and was crowned four times in 1994, 2011, 2018 and 2018–19. As for the Étoile Sportive du Sahel, he participated 13 times and reached the final 3 times and was crowned once in 2007, and finally Club Africain participated 10 times and crowned it in its first final in 1991, and CS Sfaxien was satisfied with second place in 2006 with four participations.

In the CAF Confederation Cup, Tunisian clubs are the most crowned champions in the history of this competition with 5 championships. CS Sfaxien is the most crowned team with three titles in 2007, 2008 and 2013, followed by Étoile Sportive du Sahel with two titles crowned in 2006 and 2015.

But misfortune always follows the Tunisian teams in the CAF Super Cup, as they participated 13 times and were crowned only 3 times. Etoile du Sahel won it in 1998 and 2008 and was satisfied with the runner-up in 2004, 2007 and 2016. As for Espérance de Tunis, it participated 5 times and won it once in 1995, and was satisfied with the runner-up in 1999, 2012, 2019 and 2020. As for CS Sfaxien, it participated three times in 2007, 2008 and 2014, one of which was against Etoile du Sahel du Sahel in 2008.

Best finish in Arab competitions by club 
Tunisian clubs are the second most titled Arab clubs with 11 championships (after Saudi clubs who won 12 championships). Espérance de Tunis is the most titled Tunisian club in the Arab championships with 4 championships, followed by Club Sportif Sfaxien and Stade Tunisien with two championships each.

Tunisian teams won the most prestigious Arab championships, Arab Club Champions Cup 7 times, 3 of which were for the Tunisian Espérance de Tunis, which has the record for the number of trophies in 1993, 2008–09 and 2017, two championships for the CS Sfaxien in the 2000 and 2003–04 editions, and one championship for Étoile Sportive du Sahel in 2018–19 and the same for Club Africain in 1997. As for the runners-up, the Tunisian teams took second place five times, twice for Espérance de Tunis in 1986 and 1995, twice also for Club Africain in 1988 and 2002, and Club Sportif Sfaxien in 2004–05.

Tunisian clubs have won the Arab Cup Winners' Cup three times. Stade Tunisien is the most titled Tunisian club in the championship with 2 titles in 1989 and 2001, followed by Club Africain, which won the championship only once in 1995. As for Étoile Sportive du Sahel, it was satisfied with the runner-up position in 1995 in the match that brought it together with Club Africain.

See also 

 Ligue Nationale du Football Professionnel
 Tunisian Cup
 Tunisian Super Cup

References

External links
 Tunisian Ligue Professionnelle 1 at RSSSF

 
1
Tunisia
Sports leagues established in 1907